Paul Koch (born 7 June 1966) is a former Luxembourg football player, now retired from playing. He was a member of the Luxembourg national football team from 1990 to 1998.

References

1966 births
Living people
Luxembourgian footballers
Luxembourg under-21 international footballers
Luxembourg international footballers
Association football goalkeepers
FC Avenir Beggen players
FA Red Boys Differdange players
CS Grevenmacher players
F91 Dudelange players
CS Oberkorn players